The 1975-76 Golden State Warriors season was the 31st season of NBA basketball in Oakland, California Coming off their NBA Championship, the Warriors finished with a then-franchise-best 59–23 record. The Warriors would however lose in the Western Conference Finals to the upstart Phoenix Suns, four games to three. The Warriors’ franchise-best regular-season record would be surpassed when the team won the 2014–15 championship, but in between the Warriors would play thirty-eight seasons without even reaching the Conference Finals, the fourth-longest such drought in NBA history.

Offseason

Draft picks

Roster

Regular season

Season standings

Record vs. opponents

Playoffs
In the playoffs, the Warriors returned to the Western Conference Finals by beating the Detroit Pistons in 6 games. In the Western Finals, the Warriors faced the Phoenix Suns. The Warriors had a 2 games to 1 lead. Game 4 went in overtime and the Warriors were unable to grab a 3–1 series lead. The Suns would rally to win the game 133–129. The Warriors would bounce back to take Game 5, but the Suns would win Games 6 & 7 to stun the defending Champions.

|- align="center" bgcolor="#ccffcc"
| 1
| April 20
| Detroit
| W 127–103
| Phil Smith (26)
| Clifford Ray (12)
| Rick Barry (14)
| Oakland–Alameda County Coliseum Arena13,067
| 1–0
|- align="center" bgcolor="#ffcccc"
| 2
| April 22
| Detroit
| L 111–123
| Rick Barry (27)
| Clifford Ray (12)
| Rick Barry (8)
| Oakland–Alameda County Coliseum Arena13,067
| 1–1
|- align="center" bgcolor="#ccffcc"
| 3
| April 24
| @ Detroit
| W 113–96
| Phil Smith (34)
| Jamaal Wilkes (18)
| Rick Barry (10)
| Cobo Arena10,022
| 2–1
|- align="center" bgcolor="#ffcccc"
| 4
| April 26
| @ Detroit
| L 102–106
| Phil Smith (31)
| Clifford Ray (8)
| Rick Barry (6)
| Cobo Arena11,389
| 2–2
|- align="center" bgcolor="#ccffcc"
| 5
| April 28
| Detroit
| W 128–109
| Phil Smith (28)
| Clifford Ray (14)
| Rick Barry (11)
| Oakland–Alameda County Coliseum Arena13,067
| 3–2
|- align="center" bgcolor="#ccffcc"
| 6
| April 30
| @ Detroit
| W 118–116 (OT)
| Phil Smith (37)
| three players tied (8)
| Phil Smith (7)
| Cobo Arena10,361
| 4–2
|-

|- align="center" bgcolor="#ccffcc"
| 1
| May 2
| Phoenix
| W 128–103
| Rick Barry (38)
| Clifford Ray (11)
| Gus Williams (6)
| Oakland–Alameda County Coliseum Arena12,475
| 1–0
|- align="center" bgcolor="#ffcccc"
| 2
| May 5
| Phoenix
| L 101–108
| Rick Barry (44)
| George Johnson (11)
| Rick Barry (4)
| Oakland–Alameda County Coliseum Arena13,067
| 1–1
|- align="center" bgcolor="#ccffcc"
| 3
| May 7
| @ Phoenix
| W 99–91
| Jamaal Wilkes (22)
| Rick Barry (7)
| Barry, Smith (6)
| Arizona Veterans Memorial Coliseum13,306
| 2–1
|- align="center" bgcolor="#ffcccc"
| 4
| May 9
| @ Phoenix
| L 129–133 (2OT)
| Phil Smith (30)
| Jamaal Wilkes (14)
| Phil Smith (8)
| Arizona Veterans Memorial Coliseum12,884
| 2–2
|- align="center" bgcolor="#ccffcc"
| 5
| May 12
| Phoenix
| W 111–95
| Phil Smith (25)
| Clifford Ray (16)
| Phil Smith (6)
| Oakland–Alameda County Coliseum Arena13,067
| 3–2
|- align="center" bgcolor="#ffcccc"
| 6
| May 14
| @ Phoenix
| L 104–105
| Rick Barry (30)
| Clifford Ray (12)
| Barry, Smith (6)
| Arizona Veterans Memorial Coliseum13,396
| 3–3
|- align="center" bgcolor="#ffcccc"
| 7
| May 16
| Phoenix
| L 86–94
| Rick Barry (20)
| Wilkes, Ray (13)
| Phil Smith (6)
| Oakland–Alameda County Coliseum Arena13,067
| 3–4
|-

Awards and honors
 Rick Barry, All-NBA First Team
 Rick Barry, NBA All-Star Game
 Phil Smith, All-NBA Second Team
 Phil Smith, NBA All-Defensive Second Team
 Gus Williams, NBA All-Rookie Team First Team

References

 Warriors on Basketball Reference

Golden State Warriors seasons
Golden State
Golden
Golden